The Shire of Gingin is a local government area in the Wheatbelt region of Western Australia, just beyond the northern fringe of the Perth metropolitan area.

History

The Gingin Road District was established on 12 January 1893. 11 days later, on 23 February 1893, the township of Gingin separated as the Municipality of Gingin. The municipality merged back into the road district on 26 June 1903.

On 1 July 1961, it became a shire following the passage of the Local Government Act 1960, which reformed all remaining road districts into shires.

Wards
The Shire had been divided into several wards, most with one councillor: This was changed to a no ward system in 2013.

Towns and localities
The towns and localities of the Shire of Gingin with population and size figures based on the most recent Australian census:

Population

Heritage-listed places

As of 2023, 131 places are heritage-listed in the Shire of Gingin, of which 13 are on the State Register of Heritage Places.

References

External links
 

 
Gingin